Florence Lassandro (born Filumena Costanzo ; 1900 – May 2, 1923) was an Italian-Canadian bootlegger who was the only woman to be hanged in Alberta.

Early life
Lassandro was born in Cosenza, Italy, immigrating with her family to Canada in 1909, and marrying Carlo Sanfidele (who later changed his surname to Lassandro) on October 16, 1915 in Fernie, British Columbia. Sanfidele worked for Emilio Picariello as a chauffeur and hotel manager for Picariello. Sanfidele and Lassandro also worked with Picariello in his bootlegging operations, when Prohibition was declared in Alberta in 1916, and 1917 in British Columbia. Lassandro was also Picariello's mistress.

Picariello was an entrepreneur based in Blairmore, Alberta. He was engaged in many legal businesses including manufacturing ice cream and operating the Alberta Hotel in Blairmore; however this became a front for his bootlegging activity.  Charlie Lassandro was one of Picariello's employees, and permitted Lassandro to work with Picariello to smuggle alcohol from British Columbia to Alberta and Montana.

Murder and hanging
Picariello's son became involved in a police chase on September 21, 1922, during which he was shot in the hand by Constable Stephen O. Lawson of the Alberta Provincial Police. Picariello had assumed that his son had been killed when he heard a rumour that he had been shot and went to confront Lawson. In Coleman, Picariello and Lassandro confronted Constable Lawson, who was fatally shot in front of his home by the pair.

Both Picariello and Lassandro were arrested the following day, and were convicted for Lawson's murder; however, the trial was a questionable affair of who actually shot Lawson. Nevertheless, both were sentenced to hanging on December 2, 1922; they unsuccessfully sought clemency from the courts, the Justice Minister, and the Prime Minister. Originally scheduled to hang on February 21, 1923, Lassandro and Picariello were hanged on the gallows of Fort Saskatchewan penitentiary on May 2, 1923, with Lassandro's last words being "I forgive everybody." Picariello was popular in Alberta, and public opinion was on the side of Picariello and Lassandro on the day of their executions with many feeling that the death sentences handed down by the court to be excessively harsh in view of the mitigating circumstances. The executions of Picariello and Lassandro are credited with helping to turn public opinion against Prohibition in Alberta.

On February 1, 2003, Canadian composer John Estacio, and Canadian librettist John Murrell, premiered, in Calgary, Alberta, Filumena, an opera based on Lassandro's life and death. The opera was performed at the Banff Centre for the Arts in August 2003; was featured in Ottawa, Ontario in April 2005, during the Alberta Scene Festival, which celebrated Albertan culture during the centenary anniversary; and, in November 2005, was the opening work of the 2005/2006 season of the Edmonton Opera in Edmonton, Alberta. The Canadian Broadcasting Corporation broadcast a performance of this opera on March 9, 2006.

References

Further reading

External links 
Filumena Opera Website
Alberta Scene Website 

Italian emigrants to Canada
Executed Canadian people
People executed for murder
People executed by Canada by hanging
Italian people executed abroad
Executed Italian women
Executed Canadian women
Canadian people convicted of murder
Italian people convicted of murder
People convicted of murder by Canada
Italian people convicted of murdering police officers
Canadian people convicted of murdering police officers
People executed for murdering police officers
1923 deaths
Crowsnest Pass, Alberta
Bootleggers
Prohibition-era gangsters
1900 births
Executed Italian people
Canadian female murderers
Canadian gangsters of Italian descent
Canadian people of Calabrian descent